Brett Thompson (born June 14, 1977) is an American professional stock car racing driver. He is a long-time competitor in the NASCAR K&N Pro Series West, but also has seven NASCAR Camping World Truck Series starts as well.

Motorsports career results

NASCAR
(key) (Bold – Pole position awarded by qualifying time. Italics – Pole position earned by points standings or practice time. * – Most laps led.)

Camping World Truck Series

K&N Pro Series West

K&N Pro Series East

References

External links
 

Living people
1977 births
NASCAR drivers
NASCAR team owners
People from Jerome, Idaho
Racing drivers from Idaho